Auburn High School is the only public high school in Auburn, Massachusetts, United States, a town approximately five miles south of Worcester. It has an enrollment of 724 students in grades 9-12, as of the 2017–2018 school year. Founded in 1935, the original school building served the town until the spring of 2006. In August 2006, the town of Auburn opened a new facility directly behind the original building.

Stadium
Auburn High School's sports venue is called Auburn Memorial Field. New as of August 2006, the centerpiece is a lighted 1000 seat FieldTurf stadium surrounded by a 6 lane track. The stadium is used for AHS Football, AHS Soccer (boys and girls) and AHS Track and Field (boys and girls). In addition, the stadium has two long jump runways and sand pits for Track and Field, as well as a pole vault and high jump area.

There is also a lighted FieldTurf facility dedicated for AHS Field Hockey  New baseball and softball fields have also been built on the grounds, with the softball field being on the site of the old high school.

Academics

We the People consists of students from the AP Government and Politics class. The competition, held at the Edward M. Kennedy Institute, simulates congressional hearings where Auburn students compete against schools from all over Massachusetts. Topics include philosophers, the founding of America, and how the Constitution affects our day-to-day lives. The We the People team finished second place in the state competition.

For the last 10 years Auburn High School's Advanced Placement United States Government & Politics class has competed in an academically demanding event known as the "We the People..." State Competition. Mr. Kennard and Mr. Benacchio run the "We The People..." team and each year the competition, held in late January, is hosted by The Edward M. Kennedy Institute for the Senate (Formally held at Harvard University's John F. Kennedy School of Government, and the John Joseph Moakley United States Courthouse.) Auburn was named 2014 & 2015 Massachusetts We the People State champions.[3] As state champions, Auburn High School represented Massachusetts at the national level in Washington, D.C. The team raised over $50,000 each year in order to get to Washington D.C., most of which came from the local Auburn community.

In 2016 & 2017 Auburn finished third in the state.  In 2018, Auburn finished second, and was named a State Wild Card for the 2018 National Competition.

We the People: The Citizen and the Constitution provides students with the opportunity to utilize and expand upon their knowledge regarding civic education by simulating congressional hearings. This program is the most extensive educational program in the country that prepares young adults to be active and informed citizens who are able to contribute to the betterment of society.[4]

Notable alumni

Tyler Beede (born 1993), baseball pitcher for the San Francisco Giants 
Barbara Marois - member of US Women's Field Hockey team that finished 5th at the 1996 Summer Olympics
Keith McEachern - Lead singer and guitarist for the WANDAS

References

External links
Auburn High School Official Website
Auburn School District Website

Schools in Worcester County, Massachusetts
Public high schools in Massachusetts
Buildings and structures in Auburn, Massachusetts
1935 establishments in Massachusetts
Educational institutions established in 1935